The Acting Superintendent's Headquarters in Yosemite National Park was built by the U.S. Army at Camp A.E. Wood in the Wawona district of the park in 1904  to house  the commander of the military administration that operated the park in the years prior to the establishment of the National Park Service. It was moved to the Yosemite Valley in 1906. The Acting Superintendent's Headquarters is the last remaining structure at Wawona associated with the park's military administration. The cabin followed the military to the Yosemite Valley, remaining there until 1958, when it was moved back to Wawona. It is part of the Pioneer Yosemite History Center.

The roof is very steeply pitched. A small porch fronts the building. It was used as a residence while in the Yosemite Valley. It is now part of an exhibit on the Army administration in the park.

The Acting Superintendent's Headquarters was placed on the National Register of Historic Places on June 9, 1978.

See also
Other structures at the Pioneer Yosemite History Center include:
 Chris Jorgenson Studio
 Hodgdon Homestead Cabin
 Wawona Covered Bridge
National Register of Historic Places listings in Yosemite National Park

References

External links

Museums in Mariposa County, California
Park buildings and structures on the National Register of Historic Places in California
National Register of Historic Places in Mariposa County, California
National Register of Historic Places in Yosemite National Park
Military facilities on the National Register of Historic Places in California
Rustic architecture in California
Defunct museums in California
1904 establishments in California
Relocated buildings and structures in California